Black  Bear Pictures is a media company that develops, produces and finances original content for film and television. Black Bear is based in Santa Monica, California.

Since its 2011 launch, Black Bear's slate has grossed over $300,000,000 worldwide, been nominated for thirteen Academy Awards, nine Golden Globes, ten BAFTAs, and premiered at such prestigious festivals at Cannes, Sundance, Venice, Telluride, Toronto, New York, and London.

In addition, Black Bear helped to create and now owns Elevation Pictures, the leading independent film and TV distribution company in Canada.

History
The founder is Teddy Schwarzman, a film producer and former corporate lawyer who left Cinetic Media to establish his own production company.

Films
 At Any Price (2012)
 Broken City (2013)
 A.C.O.D. (2013)
 All Is Lost (2013)
 The Imitation Game (2014)
 Barry (2016)
 Gold (2016)
 Suburbicon (2017)
 The Happytime Murders (2018)
 Ben Is Back (2018)
 Light of My Life (2019)
 The Operative (2019)
 Our Friend (2019)
 I Carry You With Me (2020)
 The Rental (2020)
 I Care a Lot (2020)
 Little Fish (2021)
 Memory (2022)
 Somebody I Used to Know (2023)
 The Marsh King's Daughter (TBA)
 Dumb Money (TBA)
 Nyad (TBA)

References

2011 establishments in California
American companies established in 2011
Companies based in Santa Monica, California
Entertainment companies based in California
Film production companies of the United States
Mass media companies established in 2011